Placopyrenium is a genus of lichens in the family Verrucariaceae. The genus was circumscribed in 1987 by Austrian lichenologist Othmar Breuss.

Species
Placopyrenium ariyanense 
Placopyrenium breussii 
Placopyrenium bucekii 
Placopyrenium bullatum 
Placopyrenium caeruleopulvinum 
Placopyrenium cinereoatratum 
Placopyrenium coloradoense 
Placopyrenium conforme 
Placopyrenium formosum 
Placopyrenium heppioides 
Placopyrenium insuetum 
Placopyrenium iranicum 
Placopyrenium stanfordii 
Placopyrenium tatrense 
Placopyrenium trachyticum 
Placopyrenium zahlbruckneri

References

Verrucariales
Lichen genera
Taxa described in 1987